Antonkovo is a rural locality (a village) in Dubovskoye Rural Settlement, Beryozovsky District, Perm Krai, Russia. The population was 135 as of 2010. There are 7 streets.

Geography 
It is located on the Saya River, 16 km northwest of  Beryozovka (the district's administrative centre) by road. Rassokhi is the nearest rural locality.

References 

Rural localities in Beryozovsky District, Perm Krai